Aden-Alexandre Houssein (born 28 March 1998) is a Djiboutian judoka. He is a bronze medalist at the African Games and a two-time bronze medalist at the African Judo Championships.

Career

He won one of the bronze medals in the men's 73 kg event at the 2019 African Judo Championships held in Cape Town, South Africa. In that year, he represented Djibouti at the 2019 African Games held in Rabat, Morocco and he won one of the bronze medals in the men's 73 kg event.

In 2020, he also won one of the bronze medals in this event at the African Judo Championships held in Antananarivo, Madagascar. In 2021, he competed in the men's 73 kg event at the World Judo Championships held in Budapest, Hungary.

He represented Djibouti at the 2020 Summer Olympics in Tokyo, Japan. He was eliminated in his second match in the men's 73 kg event.

Achievements

References

External links
 
 

Living people
1998 births
Place of birth missing (living people)
Djiboutian male judoka
African Games medalists in judo
African Games bronze medalists for Djibouti
Competitors at the 2019 African Games
Judoka at the 2020 Summer Olympics
Olympic judoka of Djibouti